George Sandars (2 October 1805 – 14 May 1879) was a British Conservative politician.
He was the son of Samuel and jane Sandars.

Parliamentary Career
Sandars was first elected Conservative MP for Wakefield at the 1847 general election and held the seat until 1857 when he did not seek re-election.

Marriage and Children
He married for the first time on 3 June 1829 to Mary Anne Neder(16 March 1808-, the daughter of George Neden of Cheetham.Together they had the following children:
Jane Sanders (27 October 1830-5 march 1900)
Mary Arabella Sanders (1847-1885)

On the 18th of February, he married for the second time, this time to Arabella Walker (29 October 1804-21 august 1887), the daughter of John Walker of Manchester.

References

External links
 

Conservative Party (UK) MPs for English constituencies
UK MPs 1847–1852
UK MPs 1852–1857
1805 births
1879 deaths